Elina Svitolina was the defending champion but chose not to participate.

Barbora Krejčíková won her maiden WTA singles title, defeating Sorana Cîrstea in the final, 6–3, 6–3.

Seeds

Draw

Finals

Top half

Bottom half

Qualifying

Seeds

Qualifiers

Draw

First qualifier

Second qualifier

Third qualifier

Fourth qualifier

Fifth qualifier

Sixth qualifier

References

External links
Main Draw
Qualifying Draw

2021 WTA Tour
2021 Internationaux de Strasbourg - 1